Erik Pettersson may refer to:

Erik Pettersson (athlete) (1906–1974), Swedish Olympic athlete
Erik Pettersson (bandy, born 1990) (born 1990), Swedish bandy player
Erik Pettersson (bandy, born 1995) (born 1995), Swedish bandy player
Erik Pettersson (weightlifter) (1890–1975), Swedish Olympic weightlifter 
Erik Albert Pettersson (1885–1960), Swedish Olympic weightlifter
Erik Pettersson (cyclist) (born 1944), Swedish Olympic cyclist

See also
Erik Petersen (disambiguation)
Eric Peterson (born 1946), Canadian stage and television actor
Eric Peterson (musician) (born 1964), American guitarist